Vladimír Borský (1904–1962) was a Czech film actor, screenwriter and film director.

Selected filmography 
 A Woman Who Knows What She Wants (1934)
 Poslední muž (1934)
 Volga in Flames (1934)
 Three Men in the Snow (1936)
 The Seamstress (1936)
 A Foolish Girl (1938)
 Ladies in Waiting (1940)
 Warriors of Faith (1947)

References

Bibliography 
 Peter Hames. Czech and Slovak Cinema. Edinburgh University Press, 2010.

External links 
 

1904 births
1962 deaths
Czech male film actors
Film directors from Prague
Czech screenwriters
Male screenwriters
Male actors from Prague
20th-century screenwriters